This is a list of ethnically Tamil and predominantly Tamil speaking monarchs, who ruled in Southern India and parts of Sri Lanka and South East Asia. The ancient Tamil monarchy was largely hereditary and supported by numerous chieftains.

Tamil royal titles
 Perun-Ko, Perarasan, Irai, Iraivan (Emperor)
 Perarasi (Empress)
 Devar(King) 
 Devi(queen)
 Ko, Arasan, Mannan, Aliyan or Araiyan (King)
 Arasi (Queen)
 Ilavarasi or Piratti (Princess)
 Ilam-Ko or Ilavarasan (Prince)
 Kuru-nila Mannan or Chitarasan (Petty King)
 Chitarasi (Petty Queen)
 Antavan (Ruler)

Three Crowned Kings

The three crowned kings known as Muvendar were the traditional three Tamil dynasties that ruled the Tamilakam since the Sangam era.

 Chera
 Chola
 Pandyan

Pandyan dynasty (c. 600 BCE – 1620 CE)

Early Pandyans (c. 6th century BCE – 3rd century CE)

 Koon Pandiyan
 Nedunjeliyan I (he was mentioned in legend of Kannagi)
 Pudappandiyan
 Mudukudumi Peruvazhudhi
 Nedunjeliyan II
 Nanmaran
 Nedunjeliyan III
 Maran Vazhudhi
 Kadalan Vazhudhi
 Mutriya Chezhiyan
 Ukkirap Peruvazhudhi

Imperial Pandyans (590–920 CE)
 Kadungon (590–620 CE)
 Maravarman Avani Culamani (620-645 CE)
 Jayantavarman (645-670 CE)
 Arikesari Maravarman Nindraseer Nedumaaran (670–710 CE)
 Kochadaiyan Ranadhiran (710–735 CE)
 Arikesari Parankusa Maravarman Rajasimha I (735–765 CE)
 Parantaka Nedunjadaiyan (765–815 CE)
 Rasasingan II (790–800) CE
 Varagunan I (800–830 CE)
 Srimara Srivallabha (815–862 CE) 
 Varagunavarman II (862–880 CE)
 Parantaka Viranarayana (880–900 CE)
 Maravarman Rajasimha II (900–920 CE)

Pandyans under Chola empire (920–1216 CE)

Sundara Pandyan I (920 CE)
Vira Pandyan I
Vira Pandyan II
Amarabhujanga Tivrakopa
Jatavarman Sundara Chola Pandyan
Maravarman Vikrama Chola Pandyan
Maravarman Parakrama Chola Pandyan
Jatavarman Chola Pandya
Seervallabha Manakulachala (1101–1124)
Maaravaramban Seervallaban (1132–1161)
Parakrama Pandyan I (1161–1162 CE)
Kulasekara Pandyan III
Vira Pandyan III
Jatavarman Srivallaban (1175–1180 CE)
Jatavarman Kulasekaran I (1190–1216 CE)

Later Pandyans (1212–1345 CE)
Parakrama Pandyan II (1212–1215 CE) 
Maravarman Sundara Pandyan (1216–1238 CE)
Sadayavarman Kulasekaran II (1238–1240 CE)
Maravarman Sundara Pandyan II (1238–1251 CE)
Jatavarman Sundara Pandyan (1251–1268 CE)
Maaravarman Kulasekara Pandyan I (1268–1308 CE)
Sundara Pandyan IV (1309–1327 CE)
Vira Pandyan IV (1309–1345 CE)

Tenkasi Pandyans (1422–1620 CE)

During the 15th century, the Pandyans lost their traditional capital city Madurai to Delhi Sultanate, and were forced to move their capital to Tirunelveli in southern Tamilakam and existed there as vassals.

 Cataiyavarman Parakrama Pandyan (1422–1463 CE)
 Cataiyavarman III Kulasekara Pandyan (1429–1473 CE)
 Azhagan Perumal Parakrama Pandyan (1473–1506 CE)
 Kulasekara Pandyan (1479–1499 CE)
 Cataiyavarman Civallappa Pandyan (1534–1543 CE)
 Parakrama Kulasekara Pandyan (1543–1552 CE)
 Nelveli Maran (1552–1564 CE)
 Cataiyavarman Adiveerama Pandyan (1564–1604 CE)
 Varathunga Pandyan (1588–1612 CE)
 Varakunarama Pandyan (1613–1618 CE)
 Kollankondan ( Approx 1620 CE)

Chola dynasty (c. 300 BCE – 1280 CE)

Legendary Chola rulers

Early Chola rulers (c. 300 BCE – 850 CE)

Ellalan
Kulakkottan 
Ilamcetcenni
Karikalan
Nedunkilli
Nalankilli
Killivalavan
Kopperuncholan
Kocengannan
Perunarkilli

Imperial Chola Empire (850–1279 CE)

 Vijayalaya Chola (848–881)
 Aditya (871–907)
 Parantaka I (907–955)
 Gandaraditya (950–957)
 Arinjaya (956–957)
 Parantaka Chola II (957–970)
 Uttama Chola (973–985)
 Rajaraja Chola I (985–1014)
 Rajendra Chola I (1014–1044)
 Rajadhiraja Chola I (1018–1054)
 Rajendra Chola II (1054–1063)
 Virarajendra Chola (1063–1070)
 Athirajendra Chola (1067–1070)
Kulottunga Chola I (1071–1122)
 Vikkrama Chola (1118–1135)
 Kulottunga Chola II (1133–1150)
 Rajaraja Chola II (1146–1163)
 Rajadiraja Chola II (1163–1178)
 Kulottunga Chola III (1178–1218)
 Rajaraja Chola III (1216–1246)
 Rajendra Chola III (1246–1279), last of the imperial Cholas

Chera dynasty (c. 300 BCE – 1528 CE)

Early Chera rulers (c. 3rd century BCE – 4th century CE)

Uthiyan Cheral Athan
Nedum Cheral Athan 
Palyani Sel Kelu Kuttuvan
Narmudi Cheral
Vel Kelu Kuttuvan (Senguttuvan Chera)
Adu Kottu Pattu Cheral Athan
Selva Kadumko Valia Athan
Anthuvan Cheral
Perum Cheral Irumporai
Illam Cheral Irumporai
Mantharan Cheral Irumporai
Kanaikkal Irumporai

From inscriptions 

Ko Athan Cheral Irumporai
Perum Kadungo Irumporai
Ilam Kadungo Irumporai
Kadummi Pudha Chera

From inscribed coins 
Mak-kothai
Kuttuvan Kothai
Kollippurai/Kollippurai
Kol Irumporai
Sa Irumporai

Kongu Chera dynasty (c. 400–844 CE)

 Ravi Kotha
 Kantan Ravi
 Vira Kotha
 Vira Narayana
 Vira Chola
 Vira Kerala
 Amara Bhujanga Deva
 Kerala Kesari Adhirajaraja Deva

Chera Perumal dynasty (844–1122 CE)

 Sthanu Ravi Kulasekhara (844–870 CE)
 Kulasekhara Alvar/Kulasekhara Varma
Rama Rajasekhara (870–883 CE)
 Cheraman Perumal Nayanar
Vijayaraga (883–895 CE)
 Kotha Kotha Kerala Kesari (895–905 CE)
Kotha Ravi (905–943 CE)
 Indu Kotha (943–962 CE)
 Bhaskara Ravi Manukuladithya (962–1021 CE)
 Ravi Kotha Rajasimha (1021–1036 CE)
 Raja Raja (1036–1089 CE)
 Ravi Rama Rajadithya (1036–1089 CE)
 Adithyan Kotha Ranadithya (1036–1089 CE)
 Rama Kulasekhara (1089–1122 CE)

Venadu Chera dynasty (Kulasekhara) (1090–1528 CE)

Rama Kulasekhara (1090–1102 CE)
 Kotha Varma Marthandam (1102–1125 CE)
 Vira Kerala Varma I (1125–1145 CE)
 Kodai Kerala Varma (1145–1150 CE)
 Vira Ravi Varma (1145–1150 CE)
 Vira Kerala Varma II (1164–1167 CE)
 Vira Aditya Varma (1167–1173 CE)
 Vira Udaya Martanda Varma (1173–1192 CE)
 Devadaram Vira Kerala Varma III (1192–1195 CE)
 Vira Manikantha Rama Varma Tiruvadi (1195- ?)
 Vira Rama Kerala Varma Tiruvadi (1209–1214 CE)
 Vira Ravi Kerala Varma Tiruvadi (1214–1240 CE)
 Vira Padmanabha Martanda Varma Tiruvadi (1240–1252 CE)
 Ravi Varma (1299–1313 CE)
 Vira Udaya Martanda Varma (1313–1333 CE)
 Aditya Varma Tiruvadi (1333–1335 CE)
 Vira Rama Udaya Martanda Varma Tiruvadi (1335–1342 CE)
 Vira Kerala Varma Tiruvadi (1342–1363 CE)
 Vira Martanda Varma III (1363–1366 CE)
 Vira Rama Martanda Varma (1366–1382 CE)
 Vira Ravi Varma (1383–1416 CE)
 Vira Ravi Ravi Varma (1416–1417 CE)
 Vira Kerala Martanda Varma (1383 CE)
 Chera Udaya Martanda Varma (1383–1444 CE)
 Vira Ravi Varma (1444–1458 CE)
 Sankhara Sri Vira Rama Martanda Varma (1458–1468 CE)
 Vira Kodai Sri Aditya Varma (1468–1484 CE)
 Vira Ravi Ravi Varma (1484–1503 CE)
 Martanda Varma, Kulasekhara Perumal (1503–1504 CE)
 Vira Ravi Kerala Varma, Kulasekhara Perumal (1504–1528 CE)

Pallava Empire (c. 275–897 CE)

Early Pallavas
 Virakurcha (275–300), founder of dynasty
 Simha Varman I, Provincial governor of Palnadu region of Andhra
 Siva Skanda Varman I (300–325)
 Buddhavarman (325–340)
 Vishnugopavarman (340–350)

Middle Pallavas
 Kumaravisnu I (c. 345–360)
 Skanda Varman II (c. 360–380)
 Vira Varman (c. 380-400)
 Skanda Varman III (c. 400–436)
 Simha Varman I (c. 436–477)
 Yuvamaharaja Vishnugopa, Brother of Simhavarman I, Provincial governor of Andhra
 Skanda Varman IV (c. 477–490)
 Nandi Varman I (c. 490–500)
 Kumaravisnu II (c. 500–510)
 Buddha Varman (c. 510–525)
 Kumaravisnu III (c. 525–545)

Later Pallavas
 Simha Varman III (c. 545–554)
Simhavishnu (554–590)
Mahendravarman I (590–630)
Narasimhavarman I (Mamalla) (630–668)
Mahendravarman II (668–669)
Paramesvaravarman I (669–691)
Narasimhavarman II (Raja Simha) (691–728)
Paramesvaravarman II (728–731)
Nandivarman II (Pallavamalla) (731–796)
Dantivarman (775–825)
Nandivarman III (825–869)
Nirupathungan (869–882)
Aparajitavarman (882–897), last Pallava ruler

Ay Kingdom

Ay chieftains (early historic)
 Ay Andiran
 Ay Titiyan (the Podiyil Chelvan)
 Ay Atiyan

Medieval Ay kings
 Chadayan Karunanthan
 Karunanthadakkkan Srivallabha (r. 856–884 CE)
 Vikramaditya Varaguna (r. 884–911 CE)

Mushika Kingdom

Early rulers
 Ezhimala Nannan

Medieval rulers
 Validhara Vikkirama Rama (c. 929 CE)
 Kantan Karivarman alias Iramakuta Muvar (c. 1020 CE)
 Mushikesvara Chemani/Jayamani (c. 1020 CE)
 Utaiya-varma alias Ramakuta Muvar (early 12th century CE)

Jaffna Kingdom (c. 1277–1619 CE)

 Kulasekara Cinkaiariyan (1277–1284)
 Kulotunga Cinkaiariyan (1284–1292)
 Vickrama Cinkaiariyan (1292–1302)
 Varodaya Cinkaiariyan (1302–1325)
 Martanda Cinkaiariyan (1325–1348)
 Gunabhooshana Cinkaiariyan (1348–1371)
 Virodaya Cinkaiariyan (1371–1380)
 Jeyaveera Cinkaiariyan (1380–1410)
 Gunaveera Cinkaiariyan (1410–1440)
 Kanakasooriya Cinkaiariyan (1440–1450 & 1467–1478)
 Singai Pararasasegaram (1478–1519)
 Cankili I (1519–1561)
 Puviraja Pandaram (1561–1565 & 1582–1591) 
 Kasi Nayinar Pararacacekaran (1565–1570)
 Periyapillai (1565–1582)
 Ethirimana Cinkam (1591–1617)
 Cankili II Cekaracacekaran (1617–1619)

Kingdom of Ramnad (c. 1601–1949 CE)

List of Sethupathi rulers

Chieftains With the Madurai Nayaks (c. 1601–1677)
 Udaiyan Sethupathi (Sadaikkan) (1601–1623)
 Koottan Sethupathi (1623–1635)
 Dalavai Raghunatha Sethupathi (1635–1645)
 Thirumalai Raghunatha Sethupathi (1646–1676)
 Raja Suriya Sethupathi (1676)
 Aathana Raghunatha Sethupathi (1677)

Imperial rulers (c. 1678–1795 CE) 
 Raghunatha Kilavan Sethupathi (1678–1710)
 Muthu Vairavanatha Sethupathi I (1710–1712)
  Vijaya Raghunatha Sethupathi (1713-1725)
 Sundaresvara Raghunatha Sethupathi (1725)
 Bavani Sangara Sethupathi (1725–1727)
 Kumara Muthu Vijaya Raghunatha Sethupathi (1728–1735)
 Sivakumara Muthu Vijaya Raghunatha Sethupathi (1735–1747)
 Rakka Thevar Sethupathi (1748)
 Sella Muthu Vijaya Raghunatha Sethupathi (1749–1762)
 Muthuramalinga Vijaya Ragunatha Sethupathi I (1762–1772 or 1781–1795)

Rulers of princely state under British Raj (c. 1795–1949 CE)

As king
 Mangaleswari Nachiyar (1795–1803)

As Zamindars
 Mangaleswari Nachiyar (1803–1807)
 Annaswami Sethupathi (1807–1820)
 Ramaswami Sethupathi (1820–1830)
 Muthu Chella Thevar Sethupathi (1830–1846)
 Parvatha Vardhani Ammal Nachchiyar (1846–1862)
 Muthuramalinga Sethupathi II (1862–1873)
 Court of Wards (1873–1889)
 Bhaskara Sethupathy (1889–1903)
 Dinakara Sethupathy 
 Raja Rajeswara Sethupathi (1903–1929)
 Shanmugha Rajeswara Sethupathi (1929–1949)

Pudukkottai Kingdom (c. 1686–1948 CE)

 Raghunatha Raya Tondaiman (1686–1730), first ruler
 Vijaya Raghunatha Raya Tondaiman I (1730–1769)
 Raya Raghunatha Tondaiman (1769–December 1789)
 Vijaya Raghunatha Tondaiman (December 1789–February 1, 1807)
 Vijaya Raghunatha Raya Tondaiman II (February 1, 1807–June 1825)
 Raghunatha Tondaiman (June 1825–July 13, 1839)
 Ramachandra Tondaiman (July 13, 1839 – April 15, 1886)
 Martanda Bhairava Tondaiman (April 15, 1886 – May 28, 1928)
 Rajagopala Tondaiman (October 28, 1928 – August 15, 1947), last ruler

Sivaganga Kingdom (c. 1725–1947 CE)

 Muthu Vijaya Raghunatha Periyavudaya Thevar (1725–1750), first ruler
 Muthu Vaduganatha Periyavudaya Thevar (1750–1780)
 Velu Nachiyar (1780–1790)
 Vellacci (1790–1793)
 Vangam Periya Udaya Thevar (1793–1801), last ruler

Zamindar under British rule (1803–1947)

Velir Monarches

 Athiyamān
 Athiyamān Nedumān Añci
 Irunkōvēl
 Malaiyamān Thirumudi Kāri
 Malayamān
 Vaiyāvik Kōpperum Pēkan
 Vēl Pāri
 Ilanji Vel

Palaiyakkarar Monarches

 Dheeran Chinnamalai
 Puli Thevar
 Maruthu Pandiyar
 Veerapandiya Kattabomman
 Oomaithurai
 Maveeran Alagumuthu Kone
 Chinna Alagumuthu kone

Nayaka dynasties

Nayaks, Nayakas or Nayakars were a Telugu-origin dynasty that established themselves after the fall of the Vijayanagara Empire as sovereign rulers of Tamil territories and replaced the indigenous Tamil dynasties like Cholas and Pandyans.

Nayaks Kingdom of Gingee (1509–1649 CE)

Krishnappa Nayaka (1509–1521), first ruler
Chennappa Nayaka
Gangama Nayaka
Venkata Krishnappa Nayaka
Venkata Rama Bhupaala Nayaka
Thriyambamka Krishnappa Nayaka
Varadappa Nayaka
Ramalinga Nayani vaaru
Venkata Perumal Naidu
Periya Ramabhadra Naidu
Ramakrishnappa Naidu (d. 1649), last ruler

Madurai Nayak Kingdom (1529–1736 CE)

Nagama Nayaka, first ruler
Viswanatha Nayaka
Vitthala Raja Nayaka (1546–1558)
Kumara Krishnappa Nayaka (1563–1573)
Muttu Krishnappa Nayaka (1602–1609)
Muttu Virappa Nayaka (1609–1623)
Tirumalai Nayaka (1623–1659)
Muttu Alakadri Nayaka (1659–1662)
Chokkanatha Nayaka (1662–1682)
Rangakrishna Muthu Virappa Nayaka (1682–1689)
Mangammal (1689–1704)
Vijaya Ranga Chokkanatha Nayaka (1704–1731)
Queen Meenakshi, and the End of the Nayakas (1731–1736), last ruler

Thanjavur Nayak kingdom (1532–1673 CE)

Sevappa Nayak (1532–1580), first ruler
Achuthappa Nayak (1560–1614)
Raghunatha Nayak (1600–1634)
Vijaya Raghava Nayak (1634–1673), last ruler

Kingdom of Kandy (1739–1815 CE)

Sri Vijaya Rajasinha (reigned 1739–1747), first ruler
Kirti Sri Rajasinha
Sri Rajadhi Rajasinha
Sri Vikrama Rajasinha, last ruler

Other Tamil monarchs
 Emperor Perumbidugu Mutharaiyar (aka Suvaran Maran) of Mutharaiyar dynasty
 Bhuvanaikabahu VI of Kotte (aka Chempaha Perumal)
 Kadava dynasty
 Alagakkonara
 Sambuvaraya
 Akkarayan
 Pandara Vanniyan
 Magadai Mandalam
 Valvil Ori
 Sena and Guttika
 The Five Dravidians
 The Six Dravidians
 Valai Vannan (A Nakar king, who was mentioned in Manimekalai).
 Vallavaraiyan Vandiyadevan was a vassal and brother-in-law of Rajaraja Chola I.

See also
History of South India
History of Tamil Nadu
History of Kerala
History of Sri Lanka

References

Tamil history
Hindu dynasties
 
T
T